Stade Spiritain is a football club of Martinique from the city of Saint-Esprit.

They play in the Martinique's first division, the Martinique Championnat National.

Achievements
Martinique Championnat National: 3
 1932, 1960, 1961

The club in the French football structure
French Cup: 1 appearance
1962/63

External links
 2007/2008 Club info at Antilles-Foot

Football clubs in Martinique
1922 establishments in Martinique